Derek Shaw may refer to:

 Derek Shaw (businessman), English businessman, former chairman of English football club Preston North End
 Derek Shaw (footballer) (born 1959), former Australian rules footballer